Spada is the Italian word for sword and a surname of Italian origin. It may refer to:

People
 Bernardino Spada (1594–1661), Italian Roman Catholic cardinal; patron of the arts
 Constanza Spada, stage name of Italian actress, singer and model Laura Troschel (1944–2016)
 Ercole Spada (born 1937), Italian automobile designer
 Fabrizio Spada (1643–1717), Italian Roman Catholic cardinal and Cardinal Secretary of State
 Giambattista Spada (1597–1675), Italian Roman Catholic cardinal
 Giovanni Jacopo Spada (1680–1774), Italian naturalist and pioneering geologist
 Giuliana Spada (born 1971), Italian retired heptathlete
 Ilaria Spada (born 1981), Italian actress and showgirl
 János Spáda (1877–1913), Hungarian architect also known as John Spada
 Katiuscia Spada (born 1981), Italian sport shooter
 Leonello Spada (1576–1622), Italian painter of the Baroque era
 Lorenzo Spada (died 1544), Italian Roman Catholic prelate and Bishop of Calvi Risorta
 Marcantonio M. Spada (born 1970), Italian-British psychologist
 Marcello Spada (1905–1995), Italian film actor
 Michelangelo Spada, Italian painter
 Mirko Spada (born 1969), Swiss decathlete
 Patricio Spada (born 1993), Argentine footballer
 Robert Spada, American politician
 Romi Spada, Swiss bobsledder in the early 1950s

Other uses
 Palazzo Spada, a historic palace in Rome
 Galleria Spada, a museum in the Palazzo Spada
 Palazzo Spada (Terni), a palace the city of Terni, Italy
 Honda VT250 motorcycle, frequently referred to as the Spada
 Spada Codatronca, Italian-built supercar by Spada Vetture Sport
 Cape Spada, the north-western extremity of Crete - see Battle of Cape Spada (World War II)
 Spada Lake, the reservoir of Culmback Dam, Washington state, United States
 Beatmania IIDX 21: Spada, a music video game
 Spada, a character from Japanese tokusatsu series Uchu Sentai Kyuranger
 Cardinal Cesare Spada, a minor character in the novel The Count of Monte Cristo whose fortune is found by protagonist Edmond Dantès